Zinc finger protein 786 is a protein that in humans is encoded by the ZNF786 gene.

References

Further reading 

Human proteins